Alexandre Zurawski (born 1 April 1998), known as Alexandre Alemão or just Alemão, is a Brazilian footballer who plays as a forward for Internacional.

References

External links

1998 births
Living people
Brazilian footballers
Association football forwards
Campeonato Brasileiro Série A players
J2 League players
Clube Atlético Metropolitano players
Kyoto Sanga FC players
Criciúma Esporte Clube players
Avaí FC players
Grêmio Esportivo Juventus players
Esporte Clube Novo Hamburgo players
Sport Club Internacional players